Lieutenant Colonel Robert "Rosie" Rosenthal (June 11, 1917 – April 20, 2007) was an American lawyer and bomber pilot. A highly decorated officer of the Eighth Air Force of the United States Army Air Forces in World War II, he received sixteen awards including the Distinguished Service Cross for "extraordinary heroism in connection with military operations against the enemy," the Silver Star (with oak leaf cluster) for "gallantry in action," the Distinguished Flying Cross (with oak leaf cluster) for "heroism or extraordinary achievement during aerial flight", the Air Medal (with seven clusters) and the Purple Heart (with cluster), as well as the Distinguished Flying Cross from Great Britain and the Croix de Guerre from France.

Biography
Rosenthal was a graduate of Brooklyn College and Brooklyn Law School, and had been working at a law firm in Manhattan when the Imperial Japanese Navy attacked Pearl Harbor.  He enlisted in the United States Army on December 8, 1941, and requested to be trained for combat. In August 1943 he joined the 418th Squadron of the 100th Bombardment Group, stationed at Thorpe Abbotts in England, as a pilot and aircraft commander of a B-17 Flying Fortress crew. In March 1944, Rosenthal's crew, nicknamed "Rosie's Riveters", with their B-17F, serial number 42-30758 bearing the same name, completed their 25-mission combat tour and returned to the United States, but Rosenthal extended his tour, eventually flying a total of 52 missions. He later became commanding officer of the 350th and 418th Bombardment Squadrons.

In 2006, Rosenthal was inducted into the Jewish-American Hall of Fame and medals were made depicting Rosenthal and his crew.

Notable missions
On only his third mission with the 100th Bombardment Group, out of 13 B-17s on an October 10, 1943 mission over Münster, the Royal Flush B-17F (USAAF s/n 42-6087) that Rosenthal's crew was flying that day; was the only plane to return, with two engines dead, the intercom and the oxygen system non-functional, and with a large ragged hole in the right wing.

In September 1944, Rosenthal's plane was shot down over German-occupied France, and he broke his right arm and nose. He was rescued by the Free French and returned to duty as soon as he had healed.

On his next to last mission on February 3, 1945, Rosenthal led a mission to bomb Berlin. Although his bomber [A/C #44 8379] was in flames from a direct hit, he continued to the target to drop his payload; then stayed with the plane until after the rest of the crew had bailed out, just before it exploded at an altitude of only about 1,000 feet (about 300 meters). He was recovered by the Soviet Army and again returned to duty. This raid killed Roland Freisler, the notorious "hanging judge" of the Third Reich's Volksgerichtshof.

After the war, Rosenthal served as an assistant to the U.S. prosecutor at the Nuremberg trials, where he interrogated Hermann Göring.

Robert Rosenthal died on April 20, 2007, at age 89 in White Plains, New York.

Notes

External links
 Interview with Lt Col.(Ret.) Robert Rosenthal
 Robert Rosenthal, Leader in Bombing Raids and Lawyer at Nuremberg, Dies at 89 (The New York Times, April 29, 2007)
 Robert "Rosie" Rosenthal in Jewish-American Hall of Fame

Recipients of the Distinguished Flying Cross (United States)
Recipients of the Air Medal
Recipients of the Distinguished Service Cross (United States)
Recipients of the Silver Star
Recipients of the Distinguished Flying Cross (United Kingdom)
20th-century American lawyers
Prosecutors of the International Military Tribunal in Nuremberg
1917 births
2007 deaths
Deaths from multiple myeloma
Brooklyn College alumni
Brooklyn Law School alumni
Recipients of the Croix de Guerre 1939–1945 (France)
Deaths from cancer in New York (state)
United States Army Air Forces pilots of World War II
United States Army Air Forces officers
Jewish American military personnel
20th-century American Jews
21st-century American Jews